Juan Francisco García García (born 15 July 1976), known as Juanfran, is a Spanish retired footballer, and is a current manager. Mainly a left back, he could also play as a central defender.

He started and finished his extensive professional career with Levante, which he represented in all three major levels of Spanish football, going on to amass La Liga totals of 382 games and six goals over 15 seasons and also appearing in the competition for Valencia, Celta and Zaragoza. He also played in Turkey, the Netherlands and Greece.

Juanfran represented Spain at the 2002 World Cup.

Club career
Born in Valencia, Valencian Community, Juanfran started his professional career at Levante UD, where he attracted the attention of local giants Valencia CF, signing after three seasons for €1 million. On 31 August 1997 he played his first La Liga game, a 1–2 away loss against RCD Mallorca, and went on to make 51 overall appearances for the Che.

Juanfran joined RC Celta de Vigo prior to the 1999–2000 campaign for €4 million, where he was an undisputed starter in a Galician team that appeared in the UEFA Cup and the 2003–04 UEFA Champions League (he scored in a 1–1 draw at Club Brugge KV to progress to the knockout rounds of the latter competition). However, in 2003–04, they would also be relegated to Segunda División.
 
After leaving Celta in 2004, Juanfran joined Turkish club Beşiktaş JK, but soon fell out of favour with team management – the coach who brought him to Istanbul, compatriot Vicente del Bosque, was dismissed midway through the season – and would spend the following campaign on loan to Dutch side AFC Ajax.

In 2006–07, Juanfran returned to Spain and joined Real Zaragoza for €1.5 million, being a key defensive element to qualify for the UEFA Cup in that first year. The following season the player struggled individually and collectively, and the Aragonese club returned to the second level after a five-year stint.

Juanfran agreed to sign a two-year deal with AEK Athens F.C. on 30 July 2008, earning approximately €1 million per season. He was used regularly during his spell in Greece but, in late January 2010, was loaned to his first professional team Levante until the end of the second-division campaign; only weeks later, he bought out his contract with AEK and signed permanently until June 2012, contributing massively to the former's top-flight return after a two-year absence.

The 34-year-old Juanfran was the most used player in his position in 2010–11 (23 matches), as Levante eventually retained their status. He fared even better the following season, with the side finishing sixth and qualifying for the Europa League for the first time ever.

On 20 September 2012, in Levante's European competition group stage debut, Juanfran scored the game's only goal at home against Helsingborgs IF, netting with his preferred foot from the corner of the penalty area. On 4 May 2016, after a further four top-tier campaigns – suffering relegation in the last – the 39-year-old announced his retirement.

On 10 December 2018, in an interview with Marca, Juanfran revealed he had signed for EFL Championship club Aston Villa as a scout, focusing primarily on Spain and Portugal. He stated "it is a privilege to work for a club like Aston Villa. Everyone identifies it as a big club in England and it’s a dream come true."

Juanfran was hired in his first managerial job on 30 June 2020, succeeding Curro Torres at a CD Lugo team in the second division's relegation zone. He managed to narrowly avoid relegation, but was dismissed on 11 October after four losses in the first five matches of the new campaign.

International career
Juanfran earned 11 caps for Spain, making his debut in a friendly with Italy on 29 March 2000 after impressive displays at Celta. Subsequently, he was included in the nation's 2002 FIFA World Cup squad, and appeared in three matches out of five.

Juanfran's last game was an UEFA Euro 2004 qualifier against Northern Ireland in June 2003, playing the whole 90 minutes of a 0–0 away draw.

Managerial statistics

Honours
Levante
Segunda División B: 1995–96

Valencia
Copa del Rey: 1998–99
UEFA Intertoto Cup: 1998

Celta
UEFA Intertoto Cup: 2000

Ajax
KNVB Cup: 2005–06

AEK
Greek Football Cup runner-up: 2008–09

References

External links
  
 
 
 
 
 

1976 births
Living people
Spanish footballers
Footballers from Valencia (city)
Association football defenders
La Liga players
Segunda División players
Segunda División B players
Levante UD footballers
Valencia CF players
RC Celta de Vigo players
Real Zaragoza players
Süper Lig players
Beşiktaş J.K. footballers
Eredivisie players
AFC Ajax players
Super League Greece players
AEK Athens F.C. players
Spain under-21 international footballers
Spain international footballers
2002 FIFA World Cup players
Spanish expatriate footballers
Expatriate footballers in Turkey
Expatriate footballers in the Netherlands
Expatriate footballers in Greece
Spanish expatriate sportspeople in Turkey
Spanish expatriate sportspeople in the Netherlands
Spanish expatriate sportspeople in Greece
Spanish football managers
Segunda División managers
CD Lugo managers
Aston Villa F.C. non-playing staff
Spanish expatriate sportspeople in England